Man Ki Aankhen is 1970 Indian Hindi language film directed by Raghunath Jhalani.

Plot
After working as a teacher in delhi for several years, Master Dinanath ji decides to re-locate to a small village to spend the rest of days teaching in a nearby school, his pay is the livelihood on which she, His wife and his daughter, Geeta alias Guddi, depend on him for their survival. When one of his ex-students, Rajesh Agarwal, arrives from Delhi to look after his fruit and plantation business, Dinanath welcomes him home. Shortly thereafter, Geeta and Rajesh fall in love and are married in a simple ceremony. Rajesh wanted to marry Geeta first before telling his mother and elder married brother, Naresh, as he is afraid that his dowry-seeking mommy, may forbid him from marrying Geeta. He hopes that she will ultimately give-in and accept Geeta as her daughter-in-law. with this hope that, they depart for Delhi. Two months later, Dinanath and his wife receive a letter from Geeta informing them all is well and that her mother-in-law's anger has subsided. Delighted with this news, Dinanathji decides to visit Geeta in her palatial house, not knowing that this visit will change his life forever.

Cast
Dharmendra - as Rajesh Agarwal.
Waheeda Rehman - as Guddi/Geeta.
Sujit Kumar - as Naresh Agarwal.
Faryal - as Vandana N. Agarwal.
Manmohan Krishna - as Master Dinanath.
Leela Chitnis - as Mrs Dinanath.
Mohan Sherry - as Mr Keshav.
Brahm Bhardwaj - as Rai Bahadur.
Lalita Pawar - as Mother of Rajesh Agarwal or Naresh Agarwal.

Songs
The music of the movie was composed by Laxmikant Pyarelal. The lyrics were penned by Sahir Ludhianvi.
 "Dil Kahe Ruk Ja re" - Mohammad Rafi
 "Chala Bhi Aa Aaja Rasiya chhabile" - Mohammad Rafi, Lata Mangeshkar
 "Aankhe Sharab Ki hai" - Manna Dey, Lata Mangeshkar
 "Arre Maa Gauri Maa" - Asha Bhosle
 "Bahut Der Tumne Sataya Hai Mujhko tune" - Asha Bhosle
 "Kya Tum Wohi Ho jisne" - Mohammed Rafi, Suman Kalyanpur

References

External links 
 

1970 films
1970s Hindi-language films
Films scored by Laxmikant–Pyarelal